Miss Caribbean UK 2015, the 2nd edition of the Miss Caribbean UK pageant, was held on 5 December 2015 at the Shaw Theatre in London, UK. Keeleigh Griffith crowned her successor, the Commonwealth long jump athlete Amy Harris-Willock, who was representing Antigua and Barbuda. Sixteen contestants competed for the crown.

References

External links
 

2015